Hans Arnold Rothholz (1919–2000) was a poster designer and graphic artist born in Dresden, Germany who immigrated to Britain in 1933. As a friend and colleague of Tom Eckersley, George Him and Abram Games, Rothholz belonged to a generation of designers who transformed visual communication in Britain.

Rothholz's posters are featured in many public collections, including the Imperial War Museum, the Victoria and Albert Museum and the London Transport Museum, and his archive is located at University of Brighton Design Archives.

Education 
Rothholz began his artistic training at Willesden School of Art, then studied commercial art and display design at the Reimann School, London (1938-9) - a successor of the renowned Reimann Schule in Berlin. He was one of the few students to receive the Reimann School Diploma.

Career

1940s 
During the Second World War Rothholz was interned in Canada, Liverpool, and on the Isle of Man, however he returned to London in 1942 where he established a successful career as a graphic and information designer.

Rothholz designed posters for various clients, including the Post Office and the Royal Society for the Prevention of Accidents (RoSPA). He also designed promotional material for Wembley Stadium which included the 1948 Olympic Games.

1950s 
In 1951 Rothholz was commissioned to work on the Land Travelling Exhibition as part of the Festival of Britain. He also designed film posters for Ealing Studios.

Rothholz's other clients from the 1950s included BEA, BOAC, Perera, Lyons & Co and Splendida. Rothholz also designed the programme for the 1957 World Scout Jamboree.

1960s 
Rothholz designed graphic schemes and murals for the Bacon & Egg and Grill & Cheese restaurant chains. Throughout the 1960s, Rothholz re-branded  Winsor & Newton art materials, and towards the end of the decade, he created a new corporate identity for Wellcome, including packaging, vehicle liveries and stationery.

In 1961 Rothholz was asked to design the Society of Industrial Artists' (SIA) showcase exhibition The Art of Persuasion, and was elected a Fellow of the Society of Industrial Artists in 1962. He also served on the SIA’s Council.

Post-humous 
In 2006, British clothing designer Margaret Howell exhibited a collection of Rothholz's posters at her flagship Wigmore Street store, and in 2007 produced a calendar of his poster designs.

BFI Southbank displayed a selection of original posters, photographs and press material from Ealing Studios in 2012, including Rothholz's poster for They Came to a City (1945).

Gallery

References

Further reading 
Lawrence, David, A Logo For London, Laurence King Publishing, 2013, 
Moore, Colin, Propaganda Prints: A History of Art in the Service of Social and Political Change, A&C Black Publishers, 2010, 
Rennie, Paul, Design: GPO Posters, Antique Collector's Club, 2010,

External links 

HA (Arnold) Rothholz, graphic designer, feature on the Archives Hub
Imperial War Museum: Posters of Conflict, online visual database

German graphic designers
1919 births
German poster artists
2000 deaths
Alumni of Reimann School (London)
German emigrants to the United Kingdom